Harry Maclean may refer to:

 Sir Harry Aubrey de Vere Maclean (1848–1920), Scottish soldier and instructor to the Moroccan Army
 Harry Maclean (speedway rider) (born 1951), Scottish former motorcycle speedway rider
 Harry N. MacLean (born c. 1943), American writer and lawyer